is a Japanese retired football player.

Early life
Isaka was born in Ibaraki Prefecture on October 23, 1974. After graduating from high school, he joined JEF United Ichihara in 1993.

Career 
On October 19, 1994, he debuted as a defender against the Urawa Reds. However he did not play anymore until 1996. In 1997, he moved to his local club, Mito HollyHock, in the Japan Football League with teammate Jun Mizuno. He played as a regular player in 1997. However he did not play much in 1998 and retired at the end of the season.

Club statistics

References

External links

1974 births
Living people
Association football people from Ibaraki Prefecture
Japanese footballers
J1 League players
Japan Football League (1992–1998) players
JEF United Chiba players
Mito HollyHock players
Association football defenders